Jorunna pardus is a species of sea slug, a dorid nudibranch, a shell-less marine gastropod mollusc in the family Discodorididae.

Distribution
This species was described from California. It is found from southern California to Sacramento Reef, Baja California. It lives on or under rocks in the intertidal and subtidal, from 5 to 18 m depth.

Description
This species is similar in colouration to Jorunna parva from Japan, but a much bigger animal when fully grown. It reaches at least 50 mm in length. Its gills and rhinophores are brown instead of pale with brown edges.

References

Discodorididae
Gastropods described in 1981